Joseph Brian Gay (born December 14, 1971) is an American professional golfer who currently plays on the PGA Tour and PGA Tour Champions.

Early years 
A military brat, Gay was born in Fort Worth, Texas, but was raised primarily at Fort Rucker, Alabama, where his father was a U.S. Army non-commissioned officer involved in flight operations.  His father was also a member of the All-Army golf team in his spare time.  As an only child, Gay spent much of his youth at the Fort Rucker golf course, first at the practice area, then on the course.  Encouraged by a group of military retirees he often played with, he dominated the local tournament scene as a tween.

College career 
Gay's success as a teenager led to his receiving an athletic scholarship to attend the University of Florida, where he played for coach Buddy Alexander's Florida Gators men's golf team in National Collegiate Athletic Association (NCAA) competition from 1991 to 1994.  During his time as a Gator golfer, the team won four consecutive Southeastern Conference (SEC) championships (1991–1994), and the 1993 NCAA Division I Men's Golf Championships.  As a collegian, he was the SEC Freshman of the Year (1991), a five-time individual medalist, two-time SEC individual champion (1992, 1994), three-time first-team All-SEC selection (1992–1994), and two-time All-American (1992, 1993).  Gay was later inducted into the University of Florida Athletic Hall of Fame as a "Gator Great" in 2010.

Professional career 
Gay turned pro in 1994 and joined the PGA Tour in 1999.  He picked up his first win on tour at the Mayakoba Golf Classic at Riviera Maya-Cancun in 2008 after 293 PGA Tour starts, with his second win coming at the Verizon Heritage in 2009.  He won the event by ten strokes, finishing at 20-under par. The ten stroke victory is one of the biggest wins in the PGA Tour's history.  His best position on the year-end money list is 13th in 2009. He has featured in the top 50 of the Official World Golf Ranking, ranking as high as 35th in 2009.

Gay was not exempt to play in the 2009 U.S. Open heading into the St. Jude Classic. He was one of seven golfers who could earn the last spot in the U.S. Open by winning the St. Jude Classic, using the "Winners of multiple PGA Tour events since the last Open" exemption. Gay went on to win by five strokes over David Toms and Bryce Molder for his second wire-to-wire win of the season.

In 2013, Gay won for the first time in four years at the Humana Challenge, the fourth victory of his PGA Tour career. He defeated Charles Howell III on the second hole of a three-man sudden-death playoff when he made birdie. Earlier, David Lingmerth had been eliminated on the first extra hole. This performance helped Gay earn the PGA Tour Player of the Month award for January.

Gay did not play during the 2014–15 season after back surgery and played the next two seasons on a Major Medical Extension. A T6 at the 2017 Valero Texas Open secured his return to the PGA Tour.

In November 2020, Gay won his fifth PGA Tour event (and first in seven years) at the Bermuda Championship when he defeated Wyndham Clark in a playoff.

Personal life
Gay was mentioned frequently in Bud, Sweat and Tees: A Walk on the Wild Side of the PGA Tour by Alan Shipnuck, which profiled Rich Beem's rookie year on the PGA Tour.  Steve Duplantis, who became Gay's caddy following a split with Beem, was chronicled as well in Shipnuck's book.

Professional wins (14)

PGA Tour wins (5)

PGA Tour playoff record (2–1)

Other wins (9)
9 wins on mini tours in the U.S.

Results in major championships
Results not in chronological order in 2020.

CUT = missed the half-way cut
WD = withdrew
"T" = tied
NT = No tournament due to COVID-19 pandemic

Summary

Most consecutive cuts made – 2 (twice)
Longest streak of top-10s – 0

Results in The Players Championship

CUT = missed the halfway cut
WD = withdrew
"T" indicates a tie for a place
C = Canceled after the first round due to the COVID-19 pandemic

Results in World Golf Championships

QF, R16, R32, R64 = Round in which player lost in match play
"T" indicates a tie for a place

U.S. national team appearances
Amateur
Walker Cup: 1993 (winners)

See also 

1998 PGA Tour Qualifying School graduates
1999 PGA Tour Qualifying School graduates
2003 PGA Tour Qualifying School graduates
List of Florida Gators men's golfers on the PGA Tour
List of University of Florida alumni
List of University of Florida Athletic Hall of Fame members

References

External links 

American male golfers
Florida Gators men's golfers
PGA Tour golfers
Golfers from Texas
Golfers from Alabama
Golfers from Florida
Sportspeople from Fort Worth, Texas
People from Fort Rucker, Alabama
1971 births
Living people